Neighbourhood Renewal Fund (NRF) is a form of Local Government finance in England, launched by the Office of the Deputy Prime Minister in July 2000.

NRF is allocated to multi-agency Local Strategic Partnerships (LSPs) in the 88 Local Authority areas judged to be the most deprived based on the 2000 Indices of Multiple Deprivation. It is intended to be spent on the social regeneration of the areas to which it has been awarded, and on interventions designed to reduce the relative deprivations in those areas (such as health inequalities, educational underachievement and high crime rates).

See also
 Neighbourhood Management Pathfinder Programme
 Start Up Citywide

External links 
 Great Yarmouth LSP Currently funded programmes
 Stoke on Trent LSP Funded programmes 2004-2006

Local government in England
Neighbourhood Renewal
Public finance of England
2000 establishments in England